was a sumo wrestler from Yame, Fukuoka, Japan. His highest rank was komusubi. He earned four gold stars for defeating yokozuna. After his retirement from active competition in 1961 he became an elder of the Japan Sumo Association under the name Shikoroyama.

Career
He was born in Beijing, China, and was separated from his parents while still a child. He attempted to locate his parents who he believed may have returned to Japan by joining a sumo touring party. Upon joining professional sumo he took the Japanese surname of Iwahira. He was recruited by the active yokozuna Futabayama and joined his Futabayama stable (later Tokitsukaze stable) in January 1942. He used Iwahira as his fighting name until one tournament after he was promoted to the top makuuchi division, when he adopted the shikona of Wakabayama, taking two characters from his head coach Futabayama. His birthplace was recorded on the banzuke as Yame, Fukuoka, although he later changed his surname to Aoyama (his wife's) and his birthplace to Omiya, Saitama. His promotion followed his yusho or tournament championship in the juryo division in November 1946, the only tournament held that year. Following his strong performance in the May 1951 tournament, where he defeated two yokozuna and won the Outstanding Performance Prize, he was promoted to komusubi in September 1951, which was to be his highest rank. He fought in the top division for 49 tournaments with a win/loss record of 326/383. He was demoted from makuuchi in November 1959 after recording only one win against 14 losses. He competed in the juryo division until announcing his retirement after the January 1961 tournament.

Retirement from sumo
Following his retirement Wakabayama remained with the Japan Sumo Association as an elder under the name Shikoroyama Oyakata, and worked as a coach at Tokitsukaze stable until reaching the mandatory retirement age of 65 in November 1987.

Death
He died of a cerebral thrombosis on January 17, 2001, in Fukushima. He was 78.

Family
His son-in-law Masashi Onami was a sumo wrestler in the Tatsutagawa stable, fighting as Wakashinobu and reaching a highest rank of makushita 51. Three of his grandsons also became sumo wrestlers, all fighting out of the Arashio stable. The first was Onami (now Wakatakamoto) in 2009, followed by Goshi (now Wakamotoharu) in 2011. Wakatakakage, an amateur champion at Toyo University, joined as a sandanme tsukedashi entrant in March 2017, reached the makuuchi division in November 2019 and won the 2022 Osaka tournament.

Fighting style
His favourite techniques included ashitori (leg grab) and shitatehineri (twisting underarm throw).

Pre-modern top division record
The New Year tournament began and the Spring tournament returned to Osaka in 1953.

Modern top division tournament record
Since the addition of the Kyushu tournament in 1957 and the Nagoya tournament in 1958, the yearly schedule has remained unchanged.

See also
List of past sumo wrestlers
List of sumo tournament second division champions
List of komusubi

References

1922 births
2001 deaths
Japanese sumo wrestlers
Komusubi
People from Yame, Fukuoka
Sumo people from Fukuoka Prefecture